Lazaretto Creek is a small tidal river in Chatham County, Georgia. It divides Tybee Island from McQueens Island.

History 
Because of Gen. James E. Oglethorpe's opposition to the "peculiar" institution, Georgia's original charter had an antislavery provision. Seeing possible profits from the use of slave labor, Georgia's planters overruled Oglethorpe's wishes, and in 1749 repealed the anti-slavery provision and passed legislation to allow slavery in the then colony of Georgia.

In the legislation, the erection of a lazaretto, or quarantine station, was ordered to be built on Tybee Island. In 1767, 18 years later,  on Tybee Island's extreme western tip were purchased by Josiah Tattnall to create the quarantine station. Several hospitals there were constructed a year later, where voyagers who arrived ill were treated and those who died were buried in unmarked graves.

The lazaretto remained in use until 1785, and when the buildings came into a state of disrepair, they were re-built on nearby Cockspur Island.

The creek, which gets its name from this hospital facility, stands as a tribute to this institution.

Present day 
Today, Lazaretto Creek is crossed by U.S. Route 80, but is also popular as a fishing spot and kayaking route.

References 

Geography of Savannah, Georgia
Rivers of Chatham County, Georgia
Rivers of Georgia (U.S. state)